Massachusetts House of Representatives' 3rd Worcester district in the United States is one of 160 legislative districts included in the lower house of the Massachusetts General Court. It covers part of Worcester County. Democrat Stephan Hay of Fitchburg has represented the district since 2017. He plans to retire after 2020.

Locales represented
The district includes the following localities:
 Fitchburg
 part of Lunenburg

The current district geographic boundary overlaps with that of the Massachusetts Senate's Worcester and Middlesex district.

Former locales
The district previously covered:
 Gardner, circa 1872 
 Templeton, circa 1872

Representatives
 John G. Mudge, circa 1858 
 Russell Carruth, circa 1859 
 Albert Llewellyn Wiley, circa 1888 
 John Addison White, circa 1920 
 George Walter Dean, circa 1951 
 Edward Dennis Harrington, Jr., circa 1975 
 Emile Goguen 
 Stephen DiNatale
 Stephan Hay, 2017-2020
 Michael P. Kushmerek, 2021-current

See also
 List of Massachusetts House of Representatives elections
 Other Worcester County districts of the Massachusetts House of Representatives: 1st, 2nd,  4th, 5th, 6th, 7th, 8th, 9th, 10th, 11th, 12th, 13th, 14th, 15th, 16th, 17th, 18th
 Worcester County districts of the Massachusett Senate: 1st, 2nd; Hampshire, Franklin and Worcester; Middlesex and Worcester; Worcester, Hampden, Hampshire and Middlesex; Worcester and Middlesex; Worcester and Norfolk
 List of Massachusetts General Courts
 List of former districts of the Massachusetts House of Representatives

Images
Portraits of legislators

References

External links
 Ballotpedia
  (State House district information based on U.S. Census Bureau's American Community Survey).

House
Government in Worcester County, Massachusetts